Charles Blaine McClintock (May 25, 1886 – February 1, 1965) was an American lawyer and politician who served two terms as a  Republican U.S. Representative from Ohio from 1929 to 1933.

Biography 
Born in Paint Township, Wayne County, Ohio, near Beach City, Stark County, McClintock was educated in the public schools.
He attended Wooster (Ohio) University, and was graduated from the law school of Western Reserve University, Cleveland, Ohio, in 1912.
He was admitted to the bar the same year and commenced law practice in Canton, Ohio.
He served as assistant prosecuting attorney of Stark County 1919–1923 and prosecuting attorney 1923–1927.

Congress 
McClintock was elected as a Republican to the Seventy-first and Seventy-second Congresses (March 4, 1929 – March 3, 1933).
He was an unsuccessful candidate for reelection in 1932 to the Seventy-third Congress and for election in 1934 to the Seventy-fourth Congress.
He resumed the practice of law.

Later career and death 
McClintock was elected in 1946 as a judge of the court of appeals from the fifth appellate district of Ohio.
He was reelected in 1952 and again in 1958.
He retired in March 1963.
He died in Canton, Ohio, February 1, 1965.
He was interred in Greenlawn Cemetery, Wilmot, Ohio.

Sources

1886 births
1965 deaths
College of Wooster alumni
Case Western Reserve University School of Law alumni
County district attorneys in Ohio
Politicians from Canton, Ohio
Ohio state court judges
20th-century American judges
Lawyers from Canton, Ohio
20th-century American politicians
20th-century American lawyers
Republican Party members of the United States House of Representatives from Ohio